The term contact resistance refers to the contribution to the total resistance of a system which can be attributed to the contacting interfaces of electrical leads and connections as opposed to the intrinsic resistance. This effect is described by the term electrical contact resistance (ECR) and arises as the result of the limited areas of true contact at an interface and the presence of resistive surface films or oxide layers. ECR may vary with time, most often decreasing, in a process known as resistance creep. The idea of potential drop on the injection electrode was introduced by William Shockley to explain the difference between the experimental results and the model of gradual channel approximation. In addition to the term ECR, interface resistance, transitional resistance, or just simply correction term are also used. The term parasitic resistance is used as a more general term, of which it is usually assumed that contact resistance is a major component.

Experimental characterization
Here we need to distinguish the contact resistance evaluation in two-electrode systems (e.g. diodes) and three-electrode systems (e.g. transistors).

For two electrode systems the specific contact resistivity is experimentally defined as the slope of the I-V curve at :

where J is the current density, or current per area. When the current is a linear function of the voltage, the device is said to have ohmic contacts.

The resistance of contacts can be crudely estimated by comparing the results of a four terminal measurement to a simple two-lead measurement made with an ohmmeter. In a two-lead experiment, the measurement current causes a potential drop across both the test leads and the contacts so that the resistance of these elements is inseparable from the resistance of the actual device, with which they are in series. In a four-point probe measurement, one pair of leads is used to inject the measurement current while a second pair of leads, in parallel with the first, is used to measure the potential drop across the device. In the four-probe case, there is no potential drop across the voltage measurement leads so the contact resistance drop is not included. The difference between resistance derived from two-lead and four-lead methods is a reasonably accurate measurement of contact resistance assuming that the leads resistance is much smaller. Specific contact resistance can be obtained by multiplying by contact area. Contact resistance may vary with temperature.

Inductive and capacitive methods could be used in principle to measure an intrinsic impedance without the complication of contact resistance. In practice, direct current methods are more typically used to determine resistance.

The three electrode systems such as transistors require more complicated methods for the contact resistance approximation. The most common approach is the transmission line model (TLM). Here, the total device resistance  is plotted as a function of the channel length:

Therefore, the linear extrapolation of total resistance to the zero channel length provides the contact resistance. The slope of the linear function is related to the channel transconductance and can be used for estimation of the ”contact resistance-free” carrier mobility. The approximations used here (linear potential drop across the channel region, constant contact resistance, …) lead sometimes to the channel dependent contact resistance.

Beside the TLM it was proposed the gated four-probe measurement and the modified time-of-flight method (TOF). The direct methods able to measure potential drop on the injection electrode directly are the Kelvin probe force microscopy (KFM) and the electric-field induced second harmonic generation.

In the semiconductor industry, Cross-Bridge Kelvin Resistor(CBKR) structures are the mostly used test structures to characterize metal-semiconductor contacts in the Planar devices of VLSI technology. During the measurement process, force the current (I) between contact 1&2 and measure the potential deference between contacts 3&4.

Mechanisms
For given physical and mechanical material properties, parameters that govern the magnitude of electrical contact resistance (ECR) and its variation at an interface relate primarily to surface structure and applied load (Contact mechanics). Surfaces of metallic contacts generally exhibit an external layer of oxide material and adsorbed water molecules, which lead to capacitor-type junctions at weakly contacting asperities and resistor type contacts at strongly contacting asperities, where sufficient pressure is applied for asperities to penetrate the oxide layer, forming metal-to-metal contact patches. If a contact patch is sufficiently small, with dimensions comparable or smaller than the mean free path of electrons resistance at the patch can be described by the Sharvin mechanism, whereby electron transport can be described by ballistic conduction. Generally, over time, contact patches expand and the contact resistance at an interface relaxes, particularly at weakly contacting surfaces, through current induced welding and dielectric breakdown. This process is known also as resistance creep. The coupling of surface chemistry, contact mechanics and charge transport mechanisms needs to be considered in the mechanistic evaluation of ECR phenomena.

Quantum limit
These small devices are called quantum point contacts. Quantum point contacts behave more like waveguides than the classical wires of everyday life and may be described by the Landauer scattering formalism. Point-contact tunneling is an important technique for characterizing superconductors.

Other forms of contact resistance
Measurements of thermal conductivity are also subject to contact resistance, with particular significance in heat transport through granular media. Similarly, a drop in hydrostatic pressure (analogous to electrical voltage) occurs when fluid flow transitions from one channel to another.

Significance
Bad contacts are the cause of failure or poor performance in a wide variety of electrical devices. For example, corroded jumper cable clamps can frustrate attempts to start a vehicle that has a low battery. Dirty or corroded contacts on a fuse or its holder can give the false impression that the fuse is blown. A sufficiently high contact resistance can cause substantial heating in a high current device. Unpredictable or noisy contacts are a major cause of the failure of electrical equipment.

See also
 Contact cleaner
 Wetting current

References

Further reading
  (NB. Free download after registration.)
 
  (NB. A rewrite of the earlier "Electric Contacts Handbook".)
   (NB. A rewrite and translation of the earlier "Die technische Physik der elektrischen Kontakte" (1941) in German language, which is available as reprint under .)
 

Materials science
Electrical resistance and conductance